Charles Ryle Fay (13 January 1884 – 19 November 1961) was a noted British economic historian. He was a strong advocate of co-operation, workers' rights and women's rights. He was educated at Merchant Taylors' Boys' School, Crosby and the University of Cambridge, where he was a student alongside John Maynard Keynes. The two remained friends until Keynes' death.

Fay's papers are held at the Public Record Office of Northern Ireland.

Works
 Co-operation at home and abroad: a description and analysis, 1908
 Copartnership in industry, 1913
 Life and labour in the nineteenth century; being the substance of lectures delivered at Cambridge University in the year 1919 to students of economics, among whom were officers of the Royal Navy and students from the Army of the United States, 1920
 Great Britain from Adam Smith to the present day; an economic and social survey, 1928
 Imperial economy and its place in the formation of economic doctrine, 1600-1932, 1934
 English economic history, mainly since 1700, Cambridge: Heffer, 1940
 The corn laws and social England, 1951
 Huskisson and his age, 1951
 Palace of industry, 1851; a study of the Great Exhibition and its fruits, 1951
 Round about industrial Britain, 1830-1860, Toronto: University of Toronto Press, 1952
 Adam Smith and the Scotland of his day, 1956
 Life and labour in Newfoundland, 1956
 The world of Adam Smith, 1960

References

1884 births
1961 deaths
Economic historians
20th-century British historians